Nanango Weir is a weir located near Nanango, Queensland, Australia. It was originally constructed only used by nearby farms for agricultural use, though public recreation is now permitted.

The weir is located on Barkers Creek.

Recreation 
The weir is widely unknown to the public because of its unsigned location and small access track. The weir is a great spot for canoeing, picnics and other watersports. There is no constructed boat ramps and large vessels or motors are highly discouraged. The weir is usually full though long dry periods can affect water levels.

See also

List of dams and reservoirs in Australia

References

Reservoirs in Queensland
Wide Bay–Burnett
Dams in Queensland